{{Infobox television
| image                = AFHV new logo (main).png
| genre                = Clip showComedy
| creator              = Vin Di Bona
| based_on             = Fun TV with Kato-chan and Ken-chan
| director             = Vin Di Bona

| presenter            = 
| narrated             = 
| theme_music_composer = Dan Slider (music)Jill Colucci, Stewart Harris (lyrics, 1989–1997 version only)
| opentheme            = "The Funny Things You Do",performed by Jill Colucci (1989–1997)Peter Hix & Terry Wood (1997)
| composer             = 
| country              = United States
| language             = English
| num_seasons          = 33
| num_episodes         = 759
| list_episodes        = 
| executive_producer   = 
| producer             = Bill Barlow
| camera               = Videotape; Multi-camera(studio segments)
| runtime              = 22 minutes (1990–1999; internationally: 2001-)44 minutes (1989, 1999–2000 specials; USA/Canada airings: 2001–)
| company              = 
| network              = ABC
| picture_format       = NTSC (1989–2010)HDTV 720p (2010–)
| audio_format         = Dolby Digital 5.1 Surround Sound
| first_aired          = 
| last_aired           = present
| related              = {{Plain list|
 America's Funniest People
 World's Funniest Videos
 El Diablito (from XHDRBZ)
 Videos After Dark'
 America's Funniest Home Videos: Animal Edition}}
| location             = Manhattan Beach Studios, Manhattan Beach, California
}}America's Funniest Home Videos, also called America's Funniest Videos (abbreviated as AFV), is an American video clip television series on ABC, based on the Japanese variety show Fun TV with Kato-chan and Ken-chan. The show features humorous homemade videos that are submitted by viewers. The most common videos feature unintentional physical comedy, pets or children and some staged pranks.

Originally airing as a special in 1989, it later debuted as a regular weekly series in 1990. The show was hosted by comedian Bob Saget for the 1989 special and the first eight seasons of the series incarnation. After Saget's retirement from hosting in 1997, John Fugelsang and Daisy Fuentes later took over as co-host for its ninth and tenth seasons. After two years of being shown as occasional specials, hosted by various actors and comedians such as D. L. Hughley, Richard Kind, Stuart Scott, Steve Carell, Mike Kasem and Kerri Kasem, ABC brought the series back on Friday nights in 2001 with Tom Bergeron, who hosted the show for fifteen seasons. Season 19 champion and co-host of Dancing with the Stars, Alfonso Ribeiro took over as host in 2015 after Bergeron's retirement. On October 29, 2018, ABC renewed AFV for two more seasons, bringing to its 30th (which premiered on Sunday, September 29, 2019) and 31st (which premiered on Sunday, October 18, 2020) seasons. During the COVID-19 pandemic, host segments of episodes were filmed outside of the studio. These episodes featured quarantined individuals dealing with the lockdown and social distancing, and were called AFV@Home. The last episodes of the thirtieth season featured Ribeiro in an empty studio communicating via the large monitor with virtual audience members, which would be the format used in the 31st season. On May 13, 2021, ABC renewed AFV for a 32nd season which premiered on October 3 of the same year.

On May 13, 2022, ABC renewed AFV for a 33rd season which premiered on October 2 of the same year. For this season a portion of the live audience would return and the weekly prize money would be doubled.

Premise
AFV is based on the Tokyo Broadcasting System program Fun TV with Kato-chan and Ken-chan, which featured a segment in which viewers were invited to send in video clips from their home movies; ABC, which owns half the program, pays a royalty fee to the Tokyo Broadcasting System for the use of the format (although the original parent show left the air in 1992). Contestants can submit their videos by uploading them on the show's official website, AFV.com, on the AFV applications for Android or iOS or on the AFV Official Facebook fan page, or by sending them via mail to a Hollywood, California post-office box address. The majority of the video clips are short (5–30 seconds) and are mostly related to the host's monologues. Videos usually feature people and animals getting into humorous accidents caught on camera; while others include clever marriage proposals, people and animals displaying interesting talents (such as pets that sound like they speak certain words or phrases, or genius toddlers with the ability to name all past U.S. presidents), and practical jokes. As of 1990, the show's production process featured a group of screeners viewing the submitted tapes and grading them on a 1–10 scale based on how humorous they were. The videos graded the highest were sent to the show's producers, and then to Di Bona and another producer for final approval. Videos that feature staged accidents, people being seriously injured, the abuse of animals, or otherwise do not meet ABC network standards and practices are generally not accepted for broadcast.

Every week, the producers choose three videos that the studio audience will vote on. The winner wins $10,000 ($20,000 starting with the 33rd season) and is in the running for the $100,000 prize at the end of a block of episodes, while the runner-up receives $3,000 (later $6,000) and the third place video receives $2,000 (later $4,000). The winners of the $100,000 prize then compete for a grand prize, supplied by DisneyParks, Disney Cruise Line, or Adventures by Disney. The program's studio segments are taped in front of a studio audience (although the specials that aired in 1999 and 2000 only featured pre-recorded audience responses). Audience members are asked to dress in "business casual or nicer".

Show creator Vin Di Bona has produced two similar programs: America's Funniest People (1990–1994) and World's Funniest Videos (1996). Di Bona also created the syndicated series That's Funny, featuring home videos that were largely culled from those seen on AFHV and America's Funniest People: (2004–2006) In 2019, Di Bona also created a spinoff Videos After Dark with more adult material. Several local television stations, even those not affiliated with ABC, also developed special funny home video segments in their newscasts during the early 1990s, inspired by the series. As noted in the closing credits of each episode, most of the videos have been edited for length due to time constraints. In addition, according to the contest plugs, family members (both immediate or relatives) of employees of Vin Di Bona Productions, ABC, Inc., its corporate parent the Walt Disney Company (and for a good portion of Saget's hosting tenure, its legal predecessor, Capital Cities/ABC) and their related subsidiaries are ineligible for the show's contests and prizes.

Series overview

History

 1989–1997: Bob Saget 
The show debuted on November 26, 1989, as an hour-long special, produced by Vin Di Bona and Steve Paskay, with actor/comedian Bob Saget (then starring in the ABC sitcom Full House) as its host. Saget was assisted in hosting the special by actress Kellie Martin, then the star of fellow ABC series A Pup Named Scooby-Doo (as the voice of Daphne Blake) and family drama Life Goes On (as Becca Thatcher), which would serve as the lead-in program to AFHV for the latter show's first four seasons. Prior to the airing of the initial special, during the fall of 1989, Vin Di Bona Productions took out ads in national magazines (such as TV Guide) asking people to send in their home videos featuring funny or amazing moments.
 John Ritter was Vin Di Bona's first choice as host of the program, but was unavailable. KNBC sports reporter Fred Roggin was also approached, as well, but due to his contract negotiations with NBC, he was unable to, though Roggin would eventually host a similar show of his own  called Roggin's Heroes airing in syndication from 1991–1993. Originally intended as a one-off special, it became an unexpected hit, causing ABC to place an episode order for the show turning it into a regular weekly half-hour primetime series; it made its debut as a regular series on January 14, 1990, with Saget hosting solo. Ernie Anderson, the longtime voice of ABC, was the program's original announcer. He was replaced by radio and television actor Gary Owens in 1995, who stayed in that role until Saget left, but Anderson briefly returned via archived recordings, the final episode he appeared in airing in March 1997. Charlie O'Donnell occasionally substituted for Anderson during some season one episodes.  Besides hosting the series, Saget also served as a member of its writing staff, alongside Todd Thicke and Bob Arnott. The success of AFHV led to a spinoff called America's Funniest People, hosted by Saget's Full House co-star Dave Coulier (and co-hosted by actress/producer Arleen Sorkin for the first two seasons, then model Tawny Kitaen for the final two), focusing on videos featuring people intentionally trying to be funny by doing celebrity impressions, committing pranks, and performing short amateur comedy routines, among other things.

During the show's first four seasons, America's Funniest Home Videos aired on Sunday nights at 8:00 p.m. Eastern Time; beginning with the fifth season, the show started the Sunday primetime lineup on ABC, airing at 7:00 p.m., followed by America's Funniest People at 7:30 p.m. as part of an hour-long block of funny home videos. In season five, an animated sidekick was introduced named "Stretchy McGillicuddy" (voiced by Danny Mann), who was known for trying to tease Saget and doing other crazy things. In one episode (in season five), he was shown on the two large TV monitors on both sides of the set and Bob had to turn him off with a remote. Stretchy's catchphrase was: "Don't get a little touchy, Bob, I'm just a little stretchy!" The character was dropped from the show after the seventh season.

In 1994, ABC canceled America's Funniest People after four seasons due to declining ratings and had to decide what to do with its Sunday night 7:30 p.m. timeslot. After trying out the short-lived sitcom On Our Own in the timeslot after AFHV during the 1994–1995 season, ABC then later chose to expand America's Funniest Home Videos to one hour with back-to-back airings, with that week's new episode being shown in the first half-hour, followed by a repeat from a previous season to fill the remaining time.

On February 1, 1996, another spinoff of AFHV debuted called World's Funniest Videos, which was taped at Walt Disney World in Lake Buena Vista, Florida; this series was also hosted by Coulier, along with actress Eva LaRue. Paired with a weekly version of the popular Before They Were Stars specials on Thursday nights, World's Funniest Videos focused on funny and amazing home videos from around the world. However, due to low ratings, ABC put it on hiatus a few weeks after its debut, before cancelling the series outright after only one season and burning off the remaining episodes that summer. For Saget's final season on AFHV, most nights would have two new episodes air back-to-back, causing the season to have 30 episodes.

Numerous comedy skits were performed on the set during Saget's tenure as host. The set consisted of a living room design (the main set, originally a three-wall design with a bay window, was remodeled for the 1992–1993 season as a flatter frame outline with translucent walls – though the furniture featured on the original set remained). The beginning of each episode was tied in with a skit just before the transition was made from the introduction to Saget. This usually consisted of several actors in a fake room (usually in the upper part of the audience section or in another soundstage) pretending to get excited watching America's Funniest Home Videos, a technique that was scrapped after the fifth season. Saget always ended each episode by saying "Keep those cameras safely rolling" and then saying something to his wife who was implied to be watching the show at home.

Saget himself soon grew tired of the repetitive format and was eager to pursue other projects as a comedian, actor and director. Producer Di Bona held him to his contract, resulting in a frustrated Saget listlessly going through the motions, constantly getting out of character and making pointed remarks on the air during his last two seasons. Saget's contract expired in May 1997 and he decided to leave the show afterward. However, according to Di Bona, the producers felt a change (and change of hosts) was needed for AFV as a result of ABC going through a change of leadership (hence ABC's ownership transition from Capital Cities to Disney)., Chicago Sun-Times, June 12, 1997. Retrieved March 7, 2011, from HighBeam Research. His former Full House castmates (except for Mary-Kate and Ashley Olsen) were present in the episode prior to the $100,000 season finale, which was his final episode. Saget returned to America's Funniest Home Videos on three different occasions—first, to co-host a 20th anniversary special edition episode alongside future host Tom Bergeron, which aired on November 29, 2009 (which was three days shy of AFVs actual 20th anniversary date of its premiere on the air on November 26, 1989); a cameo appearance at the end of Bergeron's final episode on May 17, 2015, where he was driving a golf cart and to co-host a 30th anniversary special edition episode ("AFV: America... This Is You") alongside Bergeron and current host Ribeiro, which aired on December 8, 2019. Saget died almost 2 years later in early January 2022, and the episodes of the show airing in the corresponding time had small dedications and tributes for him afterwards.

1997–1999: John Fugelsang & Daisy Fuentes
After Saget's departure from the series, ABC sidelined America's Funniest Home Videos from the network's 1997–1998 fall schedule, choosing to bring it back as a mid-season replacement for Timecop. The show began to be alternately called AFV at this point (though the show officially continued to be titled America's Funniest Home Videos). After a TGIF sneak peek on November 21, 1997, the series returned for season nine on January 5, 1998, with new hosts, an overhauled look and a new rendition of the theme song, which remained in use with the guest hosts on the specials in 2000, with all episodes of Bergeron's run as host and was still heard on Ribeiro's audition tape as the new host of AFV in 2015. Comedian John Fugelsang and model-turned-television personality Daisy Fuentes took over as co-hosts of the show. Jess Harnell also succeeded Owens as the show's announcer and still holds this position to this day. They humorously narrated the clips they showed. With the Sunday night 7:00 p.m. Eastern timeslot occupied by Disney films aired as part of The Wonderful World of Disney, the show constantly changed timeslots, moving from Monday nights to Thursday nights to Saturday nights. The ratings for the show suffered during this period and both Fuentes and Fugelsang left the show after two seasons in 1999. Their last original new episode—which aired on May 6-- was taped at the House of Blues in West Hollywood, California. Until "AFV: America... This Is You," showcasing footage from Fugelsang and Fuentes' tenure, as well as all of the other AFV hosts, the only honorable mention of Fugelsang, Fuentes and segments showcasing their run was the 2-part 300th episode AFV special in November 2003 during the early years of the Bergeron run, which also showcased Saget's run of episodes in select segments as well. While Fugelsang has not been seen in new recent never-before-seen footage on the road or in the studio on AFV since leaving the show in May 1999 after only two years co-hosting it together, Fuentes made a few brief cameo appearances in interview segments likely taking place at her house speaking on behalf of her and Fugelsang (and AFV; especially during their tenure) on the "AFV: America... This Is You" special, and both Fugelsang and Fuentes appeared in further interview segments on the "AFV: America This Is You!" podcast.

1999–2000: Specials
In May 1999, ABC announced that it would discontinue America's Funniest Home Videos as a regular weekly series, but the show returned occasionally as a series of specials hosted by various ABC sitcom stars including The Hughleys star D. L. Hughley and Spin City co-star Richard Kind. Also during this period, a season was taped with Kerri and Mike Kasem as hosts for foreign markets. Future AFV host Tom Bergeron also hosted a special during this era. The show moved to a much smaller soundstage and the set featured various video screens and monitors (resembling iMac computers) placed on shelves. A special sports version of the show called AFV: The Sports Edition, which aired in 2005, that was hosted by ESPN anchor Stuart Scott, was rebroadcast every New Year's Day and aired occasionally before NBA playoff games with a post 8:30 p.m. Eastern Time tip-off until 2008. A special entitled America's Funniest Home Videos: Deluxe Uncensored (which was released only on home video and featured somewhat more risqué content than that allowed on the television broadcasts) was hosted by Steve Carell and taped on the set used from the 1997–1999 seasons. These specials (except for the special sports edition) were not taped in front of a live studio audience, with pre-recorded applause and laugh tracks were used during commercial bumpers and just before, during, and after video packages being used instead.

2001–2015: Tom Bergeron

In October 2000, ABC announced its decision to return America's Funniest Home Videos as a regular weekly series, ordering 13 new episodes. On February 3, 2001, the show returned in its third format, this time with Bergeron, who was also hosting Hollywood Squares at the time. The show was expanded to a single full hour-long episode, instead of two consecutive half-hour episodes, and was shown Friday nights at 8:00 p.m. Eastern; however, it went on hiatus for two months due in part to the September 11 attacks and also because of ABC airing specials and trying a new Friday night lineup (The Mole II: The Next Betrayal, Thieves and Once and Again), which was ultimately short-lived (Thieves ended after only ten episodes, the first eight of which aired) and the show returned to the schedule in December 2001. In his first episode, titled "Matrimony Mania", Bergeron used the set (with the bulky see-through iMac computers) from the AFV specials that aired in 2000. A new set (with a studio audience) was introduced featuring a pillar with several monitors when his first season began. In September 2003, the show returned to its former Sunday 7:00 p.m. Eastern timeslot, still an hour long (though special episodes occasionally aired on Friday nights until 2007). Unlike Saget, who provided voice-overs to the clips, Bergeron humorously narrated them, though he did lend his voice to some clips from time to time. Changes of the set were replacement of the round video wall by a curved video wall, changing the color of the pillars to blue (sometimes other colors), addition of curved light borders hanging through the set, lights under the center with return of the letters "AFV."

Starting with the 2007–2008 season, the series began allowing viewers to upload their funny home videos online at ABC.com, but has since the 2012–2013 season; launched their own website that same year and has viewers upload their videos instead to AFV.com, in addition to sending their videos via standard mail. During the 2011–2012 season, the AFV iOS app was released on the App Store, allowing users of Apple mobile devices to record and upload videos for submission to the show; a version of the app was released for Android devices the following season. In the final six seasons of Bergeron's run as host, the show started its "Funny Since 1989" campaign in 2009 and had two anniversary seasons. Season 20, in 2009, had a special 20th anniversary episode that aired on November 29, with Saget returning to AFV for the first time in 12 years as a guest. Both Saget and Bergeron ended that episode with a pinata party skit and a nod to the Star Wars lightsaber fight scenes when the credits started rolling. The pinatas resembled the looks of the two hosts. On March 7, 2014, Bergeron announced on his Twitter account that his tenure as host of AFV would end after season 25. AFV aired a 25th Anniversary Celebrity Celebration special in February 2015. Bergeron's final new episode from his in-studio stage home of 15 years (which was really his second to final episode) aired on May 10, 2015 (and for the final time in rerun form on September 13, 2015) and was the final (and season 25's second) $100,000 show of his tenure and featured at different times of the episode a look back at classic and modern funny home videos that defined the show's then-25-year run. Bergeron's "real" final new episode aired on May 17, 2015, the season finale, ending his run as host after 15 seasons (the longest hosting tenure for the series to date). The episode—taped on-location at Disneyland for that season's edition of the annual "Grand Prize Spectacular," AFVs 25th anniversary and the Disneyland Resort's 60th Anniversary Diamond Celebration that began on May 22, 2015 (which has appeared in various formats since 2005, in which one of the two (formerly three) $100,000 winners from the current season wins a Walt Disney Parks and Resorts, or in earlier seasons, an Adventures by Disney vacation package)-- featured an auto-tuned montage of clips and outtakes from Bergeron's run as host and closed with him being escorted after walking off the outdoor stage near Sleeping Beauty Castle following the grand prize presentation on a golf cart driven by Saget in a special cameo appearance. Bergeron made his first guest appearance in the studio on the season 26 "Grand Prize Spectacular" finale of Ribiero's AFV on May 22, 2016, and played the show's final on-air audience participation game "Who Breaks It?" and won an Ribiero AFV pillow and socks. Bergeron made his second AFV guest appearance alongside Ribiero, Saget and (from the John and Daisy-era) Fuentes for an AFV 30th anniversary special called "AFV: America...This Is You" on Sunday, December 8, 2019, to celebrate AFVs 30th anniversary.

2015–present: Alfonso Ribeiro

On May 19, 2015, two days after Bergeron's final episode aired, ABC announced that Ribeiro (known for playing Carlton Banks on The Fresh Prince of Bel-Air) would take over as host of AFV beginning with the season 26 premiere on October 11, 2015. Bergeron formally introduced Ribeiro's new role as host during the latter's guest performance on the season 20 finale of Dancing with the Stars (Ribeiro appeared as a DWTS competitor and won the previous season). Before becoming the current host of the show, Ribeiro made his only guest appearance in the studio on a season 25 episode of AFV playing one of the show's audience participation games with then-host Bergeron called "Who's Makin' That Racket?". While some of the Bergeron-era clip segments, the in-studio audience and background parts of the Bergeron-era set props remained intact and/or continued to air for all five years of Ribiero's tenure as host, the stage featured a metal floor layout and stairway connected to a cube screen put together like a puzzle using smaller sized flat-panel TV screens and new segments (especially for Ribiero's run) continued to be added and aired on the show. The show also introduced the Squares-era (probably in reference to the cube screen) with Ribiero's entrance as host in 2015. Additional set props like the arrow screens with flat-panel monitors on them and light-up color-changing versions of the tables where some of the studio audience sit when not in the bleacher areas made their debut to the AFV set starting in 2019. Ribeiro also humorously narrates the clip, much like his predecessor, though he makes extensive use of rhyming in his speeches.

In May 2017, ABC renewed AFV for a 28th season and, in June 2017 (and continuing that summer scheduling format even in 2018), started airing summer reruns of current season episodes of AFV on Saturday nights at 8/7 central (until college football starts up in the fall) and Sunday nights at 7/6 central. For the start of the season on October 8, 2017, instead of leading off Sunday nights, it aired Sunday nights at 8 p.m. ET/7 p.m. CT and was led into at the start of the season by The Toy Box. During some parts of the holiday season starting on November 26, 2017, and remaining that way for almost the first two months of 2018 through January 21, 2018 (and final 'repeat/repeat' on February 4, 2018), AFV aired in a 'repeat/new episode' scheduling format. AFV returned with new episodes in the 7/6 central time slot (still an hour-long on Sunday nights) due to holiday movie presentations and specials airing on ABC on Sunday nights at 8/7 central during the holiday season on December 10, 2017, and then permanently starting on February 11, 2018. ABC repeated the 'repeat/new episode' scheduling format for AFV on January 6, 2019, with new episodes returning to the 7/6 central time slot on March 3, 2019, when American Idol premieres with AFV likely to be pre-empted in some time zones when American Idol airs the live (in all time-zones) finale episodes in May 2019. ABC renewed AFV for a 29th season on March 13, 2018, which premiered at its regular 7/6 central Sunday night timeslot (and was the lead-off starting on October 7, 2018, to Dancing With The Stars Juniors) on September 30, 2018.

On Sunday, December 8, 2019, at 8:00pm local times, AFV: America, This is You! aired, a 30th anniversary special episode, with Ribeiro joined by Bob Saget (which was his final appearance on the show before his death in 2022), Daisy Fuentes and Tom Bergeron.

On Sunday, May 17, 2020, at 7:00pm local times, AFV@Home aired, a quarantine themed special, with videos impacted by the COVID-19 pandemic stay-at-home quarantine isolation and socially distanced videos. The on-set segment was replaced by filming at Ribeiro's house.

The 31st season premiered on October 18, 2020. Instead of hosting a physical audience, episodes were shot in studio with a virtual audience displayed on video screens on set. This technique was used for the last three episodes of season 30. In June 2021, AFV: Animal Edition premiered on Nat Geo Wild. On May 13, 2021, ABC renewed AFV for a 32nd season. The 32nd season premiered on October 3, 2021. The end of the January 9, 2022 episode was interrupted by a special report from ABC News about Saget's death. The January 16, 2022 episode opened with Alfonso Ribeiro's dedication to him, clips of Saget's tenure as host, and a brief discussion between Bob Saget and Tom Bergeron from the 2009 20th anniversary special. A standard pre-credits dedication was also featured. Clips of Saget's shows were put in the rest of the 2021–22 season.

On May 13, 2022, ABC renewed AFV for a 33rd season. This season marked the return of the studio audience in person, after not having them for 2 years.

$100,000 show
After every half of the season, the winners from the preceding episodes are brought back to participate in a contest to win an additional $100,000. (Previously, there would be three $100,000 shows per season, after runs of shows consisting of either 5, 6, or 7 episodes. Beginning with the 24th season, the format changed to two $100,000 shows, each one after a 9-or-10-episode run. This format was also used in season 9, as well as seasons 12–14.) Two $100,000 contests air each season (the final $100,000 episode originally aired as the season finale until the 15th season, at which point it begin airing as the episode before each season's final episode), though only one aired in the first and eleventh season. This format was used until 2002. Due to COVID-19, the 2020 season did not feature the traditional confetti, streamers, or live audience (although the virtual audience is shown instead; however a small amount of the live audience, now sitting in tables and not voting for the winner, returned in Season 33, but the confetti and streamer cannons are only fired once after the interview), and the winner was chosen by remote video chat (the top three $20,000 winners in the $100,000 show, and the two $100,000 winners in the Grand Prize Spectacular are allowed to appear on stage in Season 33).

Voting
1989–1997 (Saget era): ABC stations (5 in season one, 3 from 1990 to 1993, and 2 from 1993 onward) around the country are joined via satellite to cast their votes along with the Los Angeles studio audience (the final $100,000 show of season two was decided by a telephone vote).
1998–present (post-Saget era): Three formats have been used at various times:
 The Los Angeles studio audience votes to determine the winner.
 Viewers log onto the show's website to cast their votes.
 The show declares the winner by going to the Disney Parks and asking park-goers, as well inviting characters like Mickey Mouse, Minnie Mouse, Donald Duck and Goofy, to determine the $100,000 or the grand prize winning clip.

Other contests
 2002: "Battle of the Best": The Quad Squad ($25,000 and trip to Maui)
 2005: Disney Dream Vacation: Dog Eat Dog ($100,000 and free vacations to all 11 Disney theme parks around the world)
 2006: AFV Goes On Vacation: Dancing Machine ($100,000 and free vacations to 500+ places for 48 years)
 2006: Top 20 Countdown: The Quad Squad ($250,000 and The Funniest Video of All Time)
 2007: Grand Prize Spectacular: Plugged in Pug: Disney Dream Vacation
 2008: Grand Prize Spectacular: Not So Thrilled Ride: Adventures by Disney vacation to one of 10 places around the world
 2009: Grand Prize Spectacular: Birthday Blowout ($100,000 and free vacations to 500+ places for 50 years)
2010: Grand Prize Spectacular: The Great Escape: Trip to the Walt Disney World Resort with exclusive private time at Magic Kingdom Park
2010: Top 20 Videos that Changed the World: Chainsaw Brothers: Disney Cruise Line vacation
2011: Grand Prize Spectacular: Crying Camera Kid: Disney Vacation of a Lifetime
2012: Grand Prize Spectacular: Recovery Room Rambler ($100,000 Disney Vacation Club Membership for 40 years)
2013: Grand Prize Spectacular: Accidental Cup Crime: Disney theme parks & Adventures by Disney 
2014: Grand Prize Spectacular: Mail Slot Menace: Trip to Disneyland in California and Walt Disney World in Florida
 2015: Grand Prize Spectacular: H2O No-No: Trip to Disneyland for 60 People (to celebrate the Disneyland Resort 60th Anniversary Diamond Celebration)
 2016: Grand Prize Spectacular: Donkey Delights Lil' Dude: Trip to the Walt Disney World Resort in Florida and the new Shanghai Disney Resort in China
2017: Grand Prize Spectacular: Sedated & Elated: Collection of Disney Family Vacations
 2018: Grand Prize Spectacular: Sedated Saber Skirmish: Trip to the Walt Disney World Resort to experience the new Toy Story Land at Disney's Hollywood Studios
 2019: Grand Prize Spectacular: Blast with the Laughing Gas: Trip to the Aulani Disney Resort & Disneyland Paris
 2020: Grand Prize Spectacular: Shallow Show Stealer: Adventures by Disney river cruise
 2021: Grand Prize Spectacular: Rambling About Ambling: Disney Cruise Line vacation
 2022: Grand Prize Spectacular: Camera Confuses Canines: Trip to Walt Disney World for 10 people (to celebrate Walt Disney World's 50th Anniversary)
 2023: Grand Prize Spectacular: TBA: Disney Cruise Line vacation onboard the Disney Wish

Ratings
Season averagesAmerica's Funniest Home Videos became an instant hit with audiences, with the original special in November 1989 averaging a 17.7 rating and 25 share, finishing at ninth place in the Nielsen ratings that week. When it debuted as a weekly Sunday night series in January 1990, the show averaged an 18.0 rating/27 share, finishing at 16th place. It placed within Nielsen's Top 5 highest-rated weekly series within weeks of its debut; by March 1990, AFHV became the No. 1 primetime series for a short time. AFHV finished the 1989–90 season in the Top 10 most watched shows, with an approximate average of 38 million viewers for each episode. AFHV finished the 2009–10 season in 55th place, with an approximate average of 7.52 million viewers and finished in 69th in viewers 18–49, with 2.0/6. In 2016, a study by The New York Times of the 50 TV shows with the most Facebook Likes found that "if you could pick a safe show that appeals to almost everyone, this might be it".

Broadcast format

Beginning with the show's 21st-season premiere on October 3, 2010, America's Funniest Home Videos began broadcasting in high definition. Many viewer-submitted videos were recorded in standard definition and were subsequently stretched horizontally to fit 16:9 screens. Since the 2012–13 season, videos recorded in 4:3 standard definition are carried in their original format with side pillarboxing. This continued to be the case for videos recorded on mobile devices recorded at a vertical angle. Since the conversion to HD, the series features advisories to viewers to tilt their mobile devices horizontally when recording in order for clip submissions to fit 16:9 screens without reformatting.

In 2014, all Tom Bergeron era episodes of the show originally produced in the standard definition were remastered for widescreen and high definition broadcast compatibility, which involved cropping and stretching, with certain parts, such as the end credits, which switches to its original 4:3 aspect ratio after the first few seconds of the credits, and production logos, remained at its original 4:3 aspect ratio. Video clips recorded in standard definition and airing since the show began broadcasting in high definition are also reformatted and stretched for widescreen compatibility.

Syndication
Repeats of the show began airing in broadcast syndication in September 1995.  It also aired on TBS from October 2, 1995 – 1998 (Saget run) and again from 2014 to 2017 (Bergeron run), USA Network from 1998 to 2001, and the Hallmark Channel from August 5, 2001 – 2003, and again from January to February 2010. Until 2001, the Saget version was syndicated by 20th Television, who assumed syndication rights from their purchase of MTM Enterprises, which had syndicated the show from 1995 to 1998.
 
Currently, Disney-ABC Domestic Television distributes all versions of the series. However, the episodes from the first five seasons are aired only in off-network syndication, including PAX TV (now Ion Television) every Monday through Thursday night (later Monday through Friday night) from 2003 to 2005, and Nick at Nite for a short time from April to October 2007. Also, when Nick at Nite began airing the early Saget episodes the first week the show aired, every $100,000 Grand Prize show was aired to commemorate the show joining Nick at Nite.
The Bob Saget episodes from seasons 6–8 aired on ABC Family (now Freeform) from January 2005 to October 2007, usually on Tuesday through Saturday mornings, and occasionally on Sunday nights if a movie was not shown. The Tom Bergeron episodes began airing on ABC Family from October 1, 2007 to 2014, and were shown usually 4–6 nights a week, depending upon other programming. Episodes from the Tom Bergeron seasons and the Daisy Fuentes/John Fugelsang seasons aired on WGN America (now NewsNation) from 2006 to 2017 (Daisy/John episodes stopped airing in 2014). WGN also aired at least one of the specials produced in 1999–2000.
 
The Bergeron run of the series (seasons 11–19) started airing in off-network syndication in 2009 on select Fox, MyNetworkTV, The CW, and independent stations.

The Ribeiro run of the series (seasons 26–31) started airing on TeenNick on September 12, 2022.

In Canada, seasons 11–25 aired on ABC Spark, CMT, DejaView, YTV and Yes TV in some capacity until 2021.

Generally, a few to most AFV episodes from seasons 11–19 and 23 are available on Disney+ and seasons 20–22 and 24–25 are available on Hulu, i.e., most of the Bergeron run in their remastered form, with availability varying at random based on platform's publishing decisions.

Internationally, hour long episodes in the USA and Canada are split into two half hour parts, with a new opener and closing taped for each part. All references to the show being an hour long are also edited out. This practice began when Bergeron became host in 2001.

Merchandise
VHS/DVD
ABC, Shout! Factory, and Slingshot Entertainment have released numerous compilation releases of America's Funniest Home Videos on VHS and DVD in Region 1 (North America).

Games
Parker Brothers released a board game in 1990. Graphix Zone released a hybrid CD-ROM titled America's Funniest Home Videos: Lights! Camera! InterAction! in 1995. Imagination Games released a DVD game in 2007.

Toys
An America's Funniest Home Videos micro movie viewer was released in 1990.

See also
 America's Funniest People, people intentionally being humorous, also produced by Vin Di Bona
 Australia's Funniest Home Video Show, 1990–2004 show created by Di Bona
 Australia's Funniest Home Videos, post-2005-2013 show created by Di Bona
 Australia's Naughtiest Home Videos, a 1992 similar show and now-infamous event created by Di Bona
 It Only Hurts When I Laugh, a truTV series
 New Zealand's Funniest Home Videos (later The Kiwi Video Show)
 Ridiculousness, an MTV series using internet videos
 The Planet's Funniest Animals, an Animal Planet series
 The World's Funniest Moments, a syndicated series
 The World's Funniest!, a 1997–2000 series on FOX
 Video Gag, the French equivalent of AFHV You've Been Framed, the British equivalent of the show
 Juoko įvykiai, Lithuanian equivalent of the show
 Video Loco, Chilean equivalent of the show
 Fórky a Vtipky programs in Slovakia on Plus
 Nejzábavnější domácí videa Ameriky, in Czech Republic programs
 Paperissima, Italian equivalent of the show
 Drôle de vidéo, French-Canadian equivalent of the show airing on TVA
 Isto Só Video, Portuguese equivalent of the show
 Сам Себе Режиссёр, Russian equivalent of the show
 Det' Ren Kagemand, Danish equivalent of the show
 Ay, caramba!, Mexican equivalent of the show
 Csíííz!, Hungarian equivalent of the show
 Süper Matrak, Turkish equivalent of the show aired on Disney Channel Turkey
 Tak neváhej a toč! and Natočto!'', Czech equivalents of the show

References

External links
 
 
 America's Funniest Home Videos on Shout! Factory
America's Funniest Home Videos on ABC.com

1980s American comedy television series
1989 American television series debuts
1990s American video clip television series
2000s American video clip television series
2010s American video clip television series
2020s American video clip television series
American Broadcasting Company original programming
American television series based on Japanese television series
English-language television shows
Television franchises
Television series by Disney–ABC Domestic Television
Comedy franchises